Ben Kerfoot (born 5 August 1992, Godalming, Surrey) is an English actor best known for playing Oscar Cole in the CBBC Series M.I. High, and as Malachite in the Channel 5 TV drama series The Secret of Eel Island. He has appeared in a variety of short films and theatre.

Filmography

Television

Film

References

External links

Ben Kerfoot at Spotlight
Ben Kerfoot at Mandy

Living people
British male television actors
21st-century British male actors
1992 births